Dinohippus (Greek: "Terrible horse") is an extinct equid which was endemic to North America from the late Hemphillian stage of the Miocene through the Zanclean stage of the Pliocene (10.3—3.6 mya) and in existence for approximately . Fossils are widespread throughout North America, being found at more than 30 sites from Florida to Alberta and Panama (Alajuela Formation).

Taxonomy
 
Quinn originally referred "Pliohippus" mexicanus to Dinohippus, but unpublished cladistic results in an SVP 2018 conference abstract suggest that mexicanus is instead more closely related to extant horses than to Dinohippus.

Description
Dinohippus was the most common horse in North America and like Equus, it did not have a dished face. It has a distinctive passive "stay apparatus" formed from bones and tendons to help it conserve energy while standing for long periods. Dinohippus was the first horse to show a rudimentary form of this character, providing additional evidence of the close relationship between Dinohippus and Equus. Dinohippus was originally thought to be a monodactyl horse, but a 1981 fossil find in Nebraska shows that some were tridactyl.

References

Miocene horses
Miocene odd-toed ungulates
Pliocene horses
Prehistoric placental genera
Messinian life
Tortonian life
Piacenzian extinctions
Miocene mammals of North America
Pliocene mammals of North America
Blancan
Hemphillian
Neogene Costa Rica
Fossils of Costa Rica
Neogene Mexico
Fossils of Mexico
Neogene Panama
Fossils of Panama
Neogene United States
Fossils of the United States
Fossil taxa described in 1955